Countrypärlor was released on 21 April 2010, and is a studio album by Mona Gustafsson, mostly consisting of cover recordings of country songs, and the own-composed songs En liten bit av mitt hjärta and Hur kan du tro att jag ska glömma.

The song "En liten bit av mitt hjärta" charted at Norska Dansbandstoppen for 10 weeks and at Sverigetoppen for five weeks. Somebody Else Will was also tested for the chart in 2009, but failed to enter.

Track listing

Personnel
Producer – Dannis Lagerqvist
Recording: Liquid Studio
Mastering: Conny Ebergård, Sweton
Mixning (track 8) Lars Rosin
Photo: Ateljé Braun AB
Design: Forma
Mattias Olofsson – steel guitar
Marcus Persson – guitar

References 

Countrypärlor, album lines (2010)

2010 albums
Mona Gustafsson albums
Swedish-language albums